Sorensen, or Sorenson, is a surname that can be of Danish or Scandinavian origin. The basic derivation is "son of Søren", the Danish variety of the name Severin. The name almost exclusively comes from Danish or Norwegian emigrants named Sørensen who altered the spelling of their names when they moved to countries outside Scandinavia whose orthographies do not use the letter ø.

Notable people with this surname include:

Albert Sorensen (born 1932), American politician
Alfred Sorensen, Danish mystic, horticulturalist and writer who lived in Europe, India and the US
Arne Sørensen, Danish politician and writer
Arne Sørensen, Danish footballer and coach
Bill Sorensen, New Zealand rugby league footballer
Charles E. Sorensen, Danish-American, one of the principals of the Ford Motor Company during its first four decades
Christian A. Sorensen (1890-1959), American politician
Dane Sorensen, New Zealand rugby league footballer
Daniel Sorensen, New Orleans Saints strong safety
Edward Sorenson (1869–1939), Australian poet
Eric Sorensen (journalist), Canadian journalist
Eric Sorensen (politician), American politician
Erik Sørensen, Danish footballer
Gerry Sorensen, Canadian alpine skier
Gillian Sorensen, American member of the United Nations Foundation
Harry Sørensen (disambiguation)
James Sorensen (born 1986), Australian actor and model
James LeVoy Sorenson, American businessman and philanthropist
Jen Sorensen, American cartoonist
Jesse Sorensen, American professional wrestler
Jonathan Sorensen, American sociologist and criminologist
Kent Sorenson, American Politician
Kurt Sorensen, New Zealand rugby league footballer
Kyle Sorensen, lacrosse player
Lary Sorensen, American baseball player
Louk Sorensen (born 1985), Irish tennis player, son of Sean Sorensen
Max Sorensen, Irish cricketer
Nick Sorensen, American football player
Reed Sorenson, American race car driver
Reginald Sorensen, Baron Sorensen, British politician
Rosemary Sorensen (born 1954), Australian art critic
Roy Sorensen, American philosopher who worked on the Sorites paradox
Sean Sorensen (born 1955), Irish tennis player, father of Louk Sorensen
Søren Sørensen (1868–1939), Danish chemist
Soren Lorenson
Ted Sorensen, American presidential counsel, speechwriter, and political author; husband of Gillian
Tom Sorensen, American volleyball player
Tonny Sorensen, CEO of Von Dutch
Virginia Sorensen (1912–1991), American author
Zach Sorensen (born 1977), American baseball player

Other uses
Sorenson codec, the internal video codec used by QuickTime
Sorensen Institute for Political Leadership, affiliate of the University of Virginia
Sorenson Molecular Genealogy Foundation

See also

Danish-language surnames
Surnames of Danish origin
Patronymic surnames